Romuald-Charlemagne Laurier (January 7, 1852 – December 28, 1906) was a Canadian politician.

Born in Saint-Lin, Canada East, the son of Carolus Laurier and Adeline Ethier, he was the half-brother to the Prime Minister of Canada Sir Wilfrid Laurier. Laurier was educated at the Public
School of St. Lin and was a general merchant by profession. He was first elected to the House of Commons of Canada for the riding of L'Assomption in the general elections of 1900. A Liberal, he was re-elected in 1904 and died while in office in 1906.

Electoral record 

By-election: On Mr. Laurier's death, 28 December 1906

References
 The Canadian Parliament; biographical sketches and photo-engravures of the senators and members of the House of Commons of Canada. Being the tenth Parliament, elected November 3, 1904

1852 births
1906 deaths
Liberal Party of Canada MPs
Members of the House of Commons of Canada from Quebec